Henri Alfred Duru (22 November 1829 – 28 December 1889) was a 19th-century French playwright and operetta librettist who collaborated on more than 40 librettos for the leading French composers of operetta: Hervé, Offenbach, Lecocq and Audran.

Biography 
His father was Jacques Denis Duru (Charonne, 1784 – Paris, 18 September 1863) and his mother Avoye Eugénie Leterrier (Villiers-le-Bel, 10 May 1790 – Paris, 26 January 1871), married in Paris on 29 July 1824. As a boy he was a classmate of his principal future literary collaborator, Henri Chivot.

Duru was working as an engraver when in 1857, in collaboration with his friend from the same quartier, Henri Chivot, they wrote “L'Histoire d'un gilet”, a three-act drame-vaudeville. The piece played at the Folies-Dramatiques of the Boulevard du Temple, and on 14 November 1857 inaugurated the new theatre on the Rue de Bondy. From this time onwards, Duru worked continuously in the theatre, usually in collaboration with Chivot.

He produced almost a hundred comédie en vaudevilles, comedies and operetta libretti, which played successfully on the stages of Paris. Chivot and Duru were known for the ingenuity of their subjects, fantasy of the episodes, pure comic situations and gaiety of the dialogues.

In December 1889 he caught the flu, during the 1889–90 flu pandemic and at first seemed to be recovering, but died after a relapse.

He died before he could see his final collaboration with Chivot Le Voyage de Suzette, which opened at the Théâtre de la Gaîté on 20 January 1890. At his interment at Père Lachaise Cemetery on 31 December 1889, a speech was given on his grave by Armand d'Artois on behalf of the Société des auteurs et compositeurs dramatiques.

Works 
1873: L’Homme du lapin blanc, three-act comédie en vaudeville
1870: La Boite à Bibi, folie-vaudeville

In collaboration with Chivot 
1857: L'Histoire d'un gilet, drame-vaudeville in three acts, (premiere Folies-Dramatiques 14 November 1857)
1858: Mon nez, mes yeux, ma bouche, three acts, with Siraudin
1850: La Femme de Jephté, three-act vaudeville
1860: Les Splendeurs de Fil d’acier, three acts
1861: Le Songe d’une nuit d’avril, two acts
1863: Pifferaro, one act
1864: Les Mères terribles, one-act comedy, given at the Odéon, (first work by Duru and Chivot on a larger stage)
1865: La Tante Honorine, three-act comedy (second work by Duru and Chivot in a serious genre, for the same theatre)
1865: Les Orphéonistes en voyage, play in five acts and ten tableaux
1865: Le Rêve, opéra comique in one act by Edmond Savary, first performed 13 October 1865 Théâtre Lyrique
1865: Un homme de bronze, one-act vaudeville
1865: Les Médiums de Gonesse, one-act folie
1856: Les Chevaliers de ta Table ronde, three-act opéra bouffe, music by Hervé
1867: Un Pharmacien aux Thermopyles, one-act vaudeville
1868: Le Luxe de ma femme, one-act vaudeville
1868: L'île de Tulipatan, one-act opéra bouffe, music by Offenbach
1868: Fleur-de-Thé, three-act opéra bouffe, music by Charles Lecocq
1868: Le Soldat malgré lui, two-act operetta, music by Frédéric Barbier
1869: Le rajah de Mysore, opérette bouffe in one act (21 September 1869 Paris, Bouffes-Parisiens), music by Lecocq
1869: Le Carnaval d’un merle blanc, three-act comédie en vaudeville, Théâtre du Palais-Royal
1869: Le Docteur Purgandi, opérette bouffe in one act, music by Victor Robillard
1872: Les cent vierges, three-act operetta , with Clairville, music by Lecocq
1875: La Blanchisseuse de Berg-op-Zoom, three acts, music by Léon Vasseur
1870: Le Pompon, three-act opéra comique, music by Lecocq
1877: Le grand mogol, opéra bouffe in three acts, music by Audran (revised, in four acts for Paris in 1884)
1878: Madame Favart, three acts, music by Offenbach 
1873: Les Braconniers, opéra bouffe in three acts, music by Offenbach
1879: Les noces d'Olivette, three-act opéra comique, music by Edmond Audran
1880: La Fille du tambour-major, three-act opéra comique, music by Offenbach
1880: Le Siège de Grenade, four-act vaudeville
1881: La Mère des compagnons, three-act opéra comique, music by Hervé
1881: La Mascotte, three-act opéra comique, music by Audran
1881: Les forfaits de Pipermans, one-act vaudeville
1882: Bocace, adaptation of German libretto into three-act opéra comique, music by Suppé (as Boccaccio)
1882: Gillette de Narbonne, opéra comique in three acts, music by Audran
1882: Le Truc d’Arthur, three-act comedy
1883: La Picarde, three-act opéra comique, music by Audran
1883: La Princesse de Canarie, three-act opéra comique, music by Lecocq
1883: L’Oiseau bleu, three-act opéra comique, music by Lecocq
1883: La Dormeuse éveillée, three-act opéra comique, music by Audran
1885: Pervenche, three-act opérette, music by Audran
1885: Les Noces d’un réserviste, four-act vaudeville
1886: La cigale et la fourmi, opéra comique in ten tableaux, music by Audran
1887: Surcouf, three-act opéra comique with a prologue, music by Robert Planquette
1890: Le Voyage de Suzette, opérette in three acts music by Vasseur (first performed 20 January 1890, Théâtre de la Gaîté)

In collaboration with Labiche 
1875: Doit-on le dire?, three-act comedy
1874: Madame est trop belle, three-act comedy.
1875: Les Samedis de Madame, three-act comedy.

References

External links 
List of Duru works at the Index to Opera and Ballet Sources Online
  Alfred Duru on Wikisource
 Alfred Duru on Artlyrique.fr
 Alfred Duru on 
 Alfred Duru on Amis et passionnés du Père Lachaise

French opera librettists
19th-century French dramatists and playwrights
Writers from Paris
1829 births
1889 deaths
Burials at Père Lachaise Cemetery